Dionysus Years is an EP by the punk rock band the Humpers.

Track listing
 "Hey Shadow"
 "Insect Liberation"
 "Cops And Robbers"
 "Black Cats"
 "Dead Last"
 "Superpower"

The Humpers albums
1996 EPs